Leucotina knopi  is a species of sea snail, a marine gastropod mollusk in the family Amathinidae.

Original description
    Poppe G. & Tagaro S. (2010) New species of Haloceratidae, Columbellidae, Buccinidae, Mitridae, Costellariidae, Amathinidae and Spondylidae from the Philippines. Visaya 3(1):73-93.

References

Amathinidae
Gastropods described in 2010